The Standard Chartered Jersey Marathon is an annual marathon staged in Jersey, Channel Islands, first held in 2006.

History
The inaugural event on 8 October 2006 was the first marathon staged in Jersey for 20 years.  It attracted approximately 300 runners, and was won by Garry Payne in a time of 2:44:32.

The 2011 marathon attracted over 300 off-island runners, and saw 352 finishers in the main event.

The 2020 in-person edition of the race was cancelled due to the coronavirus pandemic, with all entries automatically transferred to 2021.

Course 
The course starts and finishes at Weighbridge Place, Saint Helier, and is set out over the town streets, central, north and west of the island.

Winners 

Key: Course record

See also
Jersey Half Marathon
JSAC Half Marathon

Notes

External links

 Jersey Marathon Website
 Course map of full marathon in 2015

References

Sport in Jersey
Standard Chartered
Recurring sporting events established in 2006
Marathons in Europe
Marathons in the United Kingdom
2006 establishments in Jersey
Autumn events in Jersey